John Rufus Gifford (born August 5, 1974) is an American politician, and diplomat, who serves as the chief of protocol of the United States. Between 2013 and 2017, he was the  United States Ambassador to Denmark.

In 2012, Gifford was Finance Director for Barack Obama's presidential re-election campaign. Once re-elected, Obama nominated him to be the United States Ambassador to Denmark, a post he held until the end of Obama's presidency. After returning to the United States, he was a candidate for the House of Representatives in 2018, running in Massachusetts's 3rd congressional district. Gifford lost in the Democratic primary to Lori Trahan, who would go on to win the general election.

He was Deputy Campaign Manager for Joe Biden's 2020 presidential campaign.

Early life and education
Gifford grew up in Manchester-by-the-Sea, Massachusetts. He graduated from St. Paul's School in Concord, New Hampshire in 1992 and he earned his Bachelor of Arts from Brown University in Rhode Island.

After college, Gifford moved to Hollywood and served as an assistant to producer John Davis. During his time there, he became the associate producer for Daddy Day Care, Life or Something Like It, and Dr. Dolittle 2, and appeared as an actor in the films Garfield: The Movie and The Hiding Place.

Political career
Gifford started in Democratic politics by working on John Kerry's 2004 presidential campaign, and subsequently started his own consulting business and advised numerous Democratic officials and advocated for progressive causes across the country.

He first met then-Senator Barack Obama in January 2007, at a party hosted by Senator Ted Kennedy. Prior to the meeting, Gifford had been offered a job on Hillary Clinton's 2008 presidential campaign, but he declined and instead accepted the same job for Obama's campaign.

After Obama took office, he served as Finance Director for the Democratic National Committee in Washington, D.C. before moving to Chicago as a senior staff member of President Obama's 2012 re-election campaign. As National Finance Director for the re-election campaign, he was ultimately responsible for the record-setting billion-dollar budget.

U.S. Ambassador to Denmark (2013-2017) 
On August 1, 2013, Gifford's nomination from President Obama to be the next United States Ambassador to the Kingdom of Denmark was confirmed by the United States Senate. He was sworn into the role on August 15, 2013, and presented his credentials to the Queen of Denmark on September 13, 2013.

In his capacity as the Ambassador, he helped modernize the transatlantic relationship through youth engagement and institution-building, among other bilateral and global issues. He outlined a diplomatic strategy that prioritized non-traditional audiences and people-to-people relationships. As part of a never-before-seen public diplomacy strategy, he was the subject of the documentary series I am the Ambassador. The documentary TV series about his life as an ambassador ran for two seasons, winning the Big Character award at the 2015 TV-Prisen award-show.

As Ambassador, he traveled to Greenland for bilateral meetings on climate change, promoted counter-extremism initiatives and Danish–American trade, and worked to maintain Danish military support in Iraq and Afghanistan. In 2016, he accompanied U.S. Secretary of Transportation Anthony Foxx, several American mayors (including current U.S. Secretary of transportation Pete Buttigieg), as well as Danish Transport Minister Hans Christian Schmidt on a bike ride around Copenhagen to showcase its success as a "cyclist-friendly city."

Gifford was an integral part of bringing the American art form of Long Form Improvisation to Denmark. In September 2016, he was in the opening show at the first improv theatre in Denmark, Improv Comedy Copenhagen, and said, "No matter what you are doing, you always have to allow time to laugh, smile and have fun. And creating that balance is incredibly important." Gifford served as an honorary board member of the American-Danish Business Council.

On January 16, 2017, Gifford was awarded the Grand Cross of the Order of the Dannebrog by Her Majesty Queen Margrethe II of Denmark for his "meritorious service to the Kingdom of Denmark."

Post-ambassadorship 
On November 13, 2017, Gifford announced on Twitter that he was running for Congress in Massachusetts's 3rd congressional district in the 2018 United States House of Representatives elections in Massachusetts. Gifford was endorsed by U.S. Senators Tim Kaine and Sherrod Brown as well as Valerie Jarrett. In the primary election, Gifford received 12,796 votes, or about 15%, coming in fifth in the 10-way race. His opponent in the primary, Lori Trahan, went on to win the general election on November 6, 2018.

On January 24, 2020, Gifford endorsed Joe Biden for president in the 2020 Democratic Party presidential primaries. 
On April 29, 2020, it was announced that Joe Biden hired Gifford to be Deputy Campaign Manager on Biden's presidential campaign. According to the Washington Post, Gifford would focus on "finance, external outreach and coalition building," in this role.

Biden administration

In January 2021, Axios reported that Biden would tap Gifford to be Chief of Protocol of the United States. He was sworn in on January 3, 2022.

Personal life
Gifford is gay, and commentators from GQ, Huffington Post, and L.A. Weekly referred to him as Barack Obama's informal "ambassador to the gay community." He married his husband, Dr. Stephen DeVincent, a veterinarian, on October 10, 2015 in a ceremony at Copenhagen City Hall in Copenhagen, Denmark. They live in Concord, Massachusetts. In 2016, Gifford co-wrote a cookbook with his husband, called The Ambassador's Kitchen. He is a Federal Club Member of the Human Rights Campaign and a Partner in Conservation for the World Wildlife Fund.

Gifford is the son of Charles K. Gifford, a banker who is the chairman emeritus of Bank of America. Gifford is a cousin of former ice hockey player and current broadcaster A. J. Mleczko.

See also
 List of LGBT ambassadors of the United States

References

External links

Official biography
Jan Dohrmann: Danish Reality Show Makes Great Public Diplomacy

1974 births
Ambassadors of the United States to Denmark
Brown University alumni
LGBT ambassadors of the United States
Gay diplomats
LGBT people from Massachusetts
Politicians from Boston
Gay politicians
Massachusetts Democrats
Living people
Grand Crosses of the Order of the Dannebrog
Chiefs of Protocol of the United States
Biden administration personnel